Among the memorials to John Adams, the 2nd president of the United States, are the following:

Buildings
 Adams House at Harvard University
 John Adams Building at the Library of Congress
 John Adams Birthplace

Counties
 Adams County, Idaho
 Adams County, Mississippi
 Adams County, Nebraska
 Adams County, Ohio
 Adams County, Pennsylvania
 Adams County, Washington
 Adams County, Iowa (named either for Adams or for John Quincy Adams)

Media
1776, 1969 Broadway musical 
1776, 1972 film adaptation of the musical 
The Adams Chronicles, 1976 television miniseries
John Adams, 2008 television miniseries

Military vessels
USS Adams (1799)
USS John Adams (1799)
USS John Adams (SSBN-620)

Mountains
Mount Adams (New Hampshire)
Mount Adams (Washington)

National parks
Adams National Historical Park

Towns
Adams, New York

Streets 

 Adams Street, Brooklyn

Other
Adams Memorial (proposed)
Included in the Memorial to the 56 Signers of the Declaration of Independence

See also
Adams High School (disambiguation)
Presidential memorials in the United States

References

John Adams
Adams, John